Greece competed in the 2017 Summer Deaflympics which was held in  Sofia, Bulgaria. Greece sent a delegation consisting of 54 competitors for the multi-sporting event.

The delegates who represented Greece won a total of 5 medals at the Deaflympic event including 2 gold medals to their medal tally.

Basketball 

Greece deaf women's basketball team created history in the basketball competition after beating favourites and European champions Lithuania in the women's basketball final to secure the gold medal with the final score ending up in the favour of Greece, 67–50. This was the first instance where the national women's deaf basketball team was managed to clinch the gold medal in the competition. However, the Greek deaf men's basketball team only managed to secure the 4th place in the men's basketball event.

Medalists

Medal table

References 

Nations at the 2017 Summer Deaflympics
2017 in Greek sport
Greece at the Deaflympics